Monterosi Tuscia Football Club, commonly known just as Monterosi, is an Italian association football club located in Monterosi, Lazio. It currently plays in Serie C.

History
The club was founded in 1968, but the first news about it date back to 2004, when it competed in Seconda Categoria. They reached Promozione in 2007, and were first promoted to Eccellenza in 2009 through playoffs.

In 2016, when Luciano Capponi took the presidency and the club was merged with Nuova Sorianese, the club was renamed to Nuova Monterosi and won the 2016–17 Eccellenza league, thus ensuring themselves a historical first time to Serie D the following season. In 2020, under head coach David D'Antoni, Monterosi narrowly missed on promotion to Grosseto following the 2019–20 season halt due to the COVID-19 pandemic in Italy.

In the 2020–21 Serie D season, Monterosi won the Girone H of the league, thus ensuring themselves a spot in the Serie C for the following season. Following te promotion, the club was renamed Monterosi Tuscia, in order to better represent the whole area of the city of Monterosi historically known as Tuscia. For their 2021–22 Serie C debut season, Monterosi had to move from their hometown stadium, Stadio Marcello Martoni, as its capacity of 500 was deemed incompatible with the league rules, and opted to relocate at the Stadio Enrico Rocchi in Viterbo for their home games.

Colors and badge
Its colors are red and white.

Current squad

Out on loan

Honours 
Eccellenza Lazio: 1
2016–17
Serie D/G: 1
2020–21

References

Football clubs in Italy
Association football clubs established in 2004
Football clubs in Lazio
2004 establishments in Italy